Viktor Mykolayovych Shokin is a former Prosecutor General of Ukraine. Having previously worked as an investigator for the Prosecutor General Office, he served as Prosecutor General for one year between 2015 and 2016.

Amid domestic and international pressure, he was removed from office by the Ukrainian Parliament in March 2016, a move welcomed by the European Union, the United States, the International Monetary Fund, and the World Bank.

Shokin's removal played a central role in the Biden–Ukraine conspiracy theory as it was falsely claimed that then U.S. Vice President Joe Biden sought to thwart an investigation into Burisma, a company tied to his son, Hunter Biden, but Obama administration officials, European diplomats, and anti-corruption advocates in Ukraine say Shokin was removed because he failed to pursue Ukrainian politicians for corruption, and that they intervened before Biden did.

Biography
Shokin was born 4 November 1952 in Kyiv. After graduating from the Kharkiv Law Institute (today Yaroslav Mudryi National Law University) in 1980, Shokin worked for the Prosecutor General Office as investigator until 2001. In an interview with Ukrayinska Pravda he stated that he was forced to retire in 2001 after refusing to take on the case against Yulia Tymoshenko.

Prosecutorial career

Shokin was appointed Prosecutor General of Ukraine on 10 February 2015, replacing Vitaly Yarema. He was a controversial appointee due to his perceived role in blocking prosecutions against those accused of shooting demonstrators in the 2014 Ukrainian revolution. As Prosecutor General, he was accused of blocking major cases against allies and influential figures and hindering the fight against corruption in Ukraine.

In early April 2015, Shokin stated that the General Prosecutor Ukraine (GPU) files about criminal orders from former General Prosecutor Viktor Pshonka had disappeared, along with Pshonka's secret casework and secret materials. Shokin stated, "I will tell you more: not only criminal cases, but classified materials have disappeared - secret records, including those related to the orders of Victor Pshonka.".

Various street protests demanding Shokin's resignation were held. On 2 November 2015, there was an assassination attempt against him when an unidentified sniper fired three shots into his office, but was foiled by the bulletproof glass window. In response to a query from Ukrainian News Agency in late 2019, the Security Service of Ukraine (SBU) acknowledged that it is continuing to investigate the attempted assassination of Shokin.

Through 2015 and early 2016, domestic and international pressure (including from the IMF, the EU, and the EBRD) built for Shokin to be removed from office.  The Obama administration withheld $1 billion in loan guarantees to pressure the Ukrainian government to remove Shokin from office. His defenders nonetheless argued that he played an important role "balancing competing political interests". His Deputy Prosecutor, Vitaly Kasko, announced his resignation on 15 February 2016 denouncing the corruption and lawlessness of the Prosecutor's office.  Shokin was also criticized in Ukraine for failing to prosecute snipers who killed demonstrators during the revolution, as well as for failing to investigate corrupt businesses.
 
On 16 February 2016, Shokin submitted a letter of resignation, although the next day an official of the prosecution office stated, "As far as I know he has taken a paid leave". On 19 February 2016 presidential press secretary Sviatoslav Tsegolko wrote on Twitter that the presidential administration had received an official letter of resignation from Shokin.

On 16 March 2016 an official of the prosecution office stated that Shokin had resumed his work. On the same day, his office carried out a raid against one of Ukraine's leading anti-corruption groups, the Anti-Corruption Action Center (AntAC), claiming that it had misappropriated aid money. AntAC was a frequent critic of the Prosecutor General's Office under Shokin. In one notorious case, two of Shokin's prosecutors were caught with stashes of diamonds, cash and valuables in their homes, likely indicating bribery. Prosecutors from another department of Shokin's office were fired or reassigned when they attempted to bring a prosecution against the so-called "diamond prosecutors".

On 28 March, protesters called for Shokin's firing, after his office was authorized by a Kyiv court to investigate AntAC. Shokin was formally dismissed in a parliamentary vote on 29 March 2016. The European Union praised Shokin's dismissal due to a "lack of tangible results" of his office's investigations, and also because people in Shokin's office were themselves being investigated. Following his dismissal Shokin went into retirement.

On 27 February 2020, a court ruling forced investigators to open a probe on Joe Biden's pressure on Poroshenko to fire Shokin. The investigation was closed in November 2020 after the election of Joe Biden as President of the United States.

Investigation into Burisma Holdings 

In 2012, the Ukrainian prosecutor general Viktor Pshonka began investigating Ukrainian oligarch Mykola Zlochevsky, owner of the natural gas company Burisma Holdings, over allegations of money laundering, tax evasion, and corruption during 2010–2012.

In 2015, Shokin became the prosecutor general, inheriting the investigation. The Obama administration and other governments and non-governmental organizations soon became concerned that Shokin was not adequately pursuing corruption in Ukraine, was protecting the political elite, and was regarded as "an obstacle to anti-corruption efforts". Among other issues, he was slow-walking the investigation into Zlochevsky and Burisma and, according to Zlochevsky's allies, using the threat of prosecution to try to solicit bribes from Mr. Zlochevsky and his team – to the extent that Obama officials were considering launching their own criminal investigation into the company for possible money laundering. 

While visiting Kyiv in December 2015, then-U.S. Vice President Joe Biden warned Ukrainian President Petro Poroshenko that, if he did not fire Shokin, the Obama administration was prepared to withhold $1 billion in loan guarantees. Biden later said: "I looked at them and said, 'I'm leaving in six hours. If the prosecutor is not fired, you're not getting the money.' [...] He got fired. And they put in place someone who was solid at the time." Whether or not Shokin's successor was "solid" was never confirmed. Shokin was dismissed by Parliament in late March 2016. In 2016, The New York Times published an article that suggested that "the credibility of the vice president’s anti-corruption message may have been undermined" by Hunter Biden’s dealings with the company.

In May 2019, Vitaly Kasko, who had been Shokin's deputy overseeing international cooperation before resigning in February 2016, provided documents to Bloomberg News claiming that under Shokin, the investigation into Burisma had been dormant. Shokin himself claimed in May 2019 that he had been investigating Burisma Holdings. This claim was supported by testimony Shokin provided on September 4, 2019 for an Austrian court. Testifying in support of his prior claims of investigating Burisma Holdings, Shokin, in a sworn affidavit dated September 4, 2019 for a court in Austria, stated that "The truth is that I was forced out because I was leading a wide-ranging corruption probe into Burisma Holdings, a natural gas firm active in Ukraine and Joe Biden’s son, Hunter Biden, was a member of the Board of Directors." Shokin continued, stating that, "On several occasions President Poroshenko asked me to have a look at the criminal case against Burisma and consider the possibility of winding down the investigative actions in respect of this company, but I refused to close this investigation."

The investigation into Burisma only pertained to events happening before Joe Biden's son, Hunter Biden, joined the board of directors of Burisma Holdings in 2014. US President Donald Trump's subsequent bid to pressure Ukrainian President Volodymyr Zelensky to announce an investigation of Joe Biden in relation to Burisma led to the December 2019 impeachment of Trump. On February 27, 2020, a Ukrainian court ruling forced investigators to open a probe on Joe Biden's pressure on Poroshenko to fire Shokin. The investigation was closed in November 2020 after the election of Joe Biden as President of the United States.

Parliamentary investigations and removal from office
In July 2015, shortly after his appointment, reformist minority member Yehor Soboliev advanced a motion to dismiss Shokin for corruption, gaining 127 of the required 150 signatures including several members of the ruling parties. Representatives of the EU and the United States pressed Poroshenko for his removal, as did the World Bank and International Monetary Fund.

In March 2016 the Ukrainian Parliament voted overwhelmingly to remove Shokin, a decision which was welcomed by the EU.

Family 

Daughter — Tatiana Gornostaeva — Deputy prosecutor of the Odessa Oblast.

Son-in-law — Alexey Gornostaev — Deputy Prosecutor of the Kievsky District of Odessa.

Matchmaker — Nikolay Gornostaev — Deputy Prosecutor of the Dnipropetrovsk Oblast.

See also
 Hunter Biden
Biden–Ukraine conspiracy theory
Burisma
Trump–Ukraine scandal
 Conspiracy theories related to the Trump–Ukraine scandal

Notes

References

External links

 Dovidka.com.ua (in Ukrainian)

1952 births
Living people
Lawyers from Kyiv
National University of Life and Environmental Sciences of Ukraine alumni
Ukrainian agriculturists
Yaroslav Mudryi National Law University alumni
Ukrainian jurists
General Prosecutors of Ukraine
21st-century Ukrainian lawyers
Trump–Ukraine scandal
Laureates of the Honorary Diploma of the Verkhovna Rada of Ukraine